Ona Danutė Buivydaitė  (born August 25, 1947) is a Lithuanian artist and designer.

See also
List of Lithuanian painters

References

This article was initially translated from the Lithuanian Wikipedia.

Lithuanian artists
1947 births
Living people
Place of birth missing (living people)